Sumoo Pappoe 'Love' Allotey (16 December 1936- April 1996) was a Ghanaian professional feather/super feather/light/light welterweight boxer of the 1950s, '60s and '70s who won the Ghanaian featherweight title, and British Commonwealth lightweight title, and was a challenger for the British Commonwealth featherweight title against Floyd Robertson, and World Boxing Council (WBC) super featherweight title, and World Boxing Association (WBA) World super featherweight title against Gabriel "Flash" Elorde, his professional fighting weight varied from , i.e. featherweight to , i.e. light welterweight.

Allotey was a world traveller, as he fought in fifteen countries, apart from his fights in Ghana, during his professional boxing career.

References

External links

Image - Love Allotey

Featherweight boxers
Lightweight boxers
Light-welterweight boxers
Super-featherweight boxers
1936 births
1996 deaths
Ghanaian male boxers